neo-Inositol is one of the stereoisomers of inositol. It is one of the nine isomeric forms of cyclohexanehexol; a group of small and chemically very stable polar molecules that have versatile properties. This stereoisomer is naturally occurring, but only in small amounts. It is also known as (1s,2R,3R,4s,5S,6S)-cyclohexane-1,2,3,4,5,6-hexol or 
1,2,3/4,5,6-cyclohexanehexol in the IUPAC naming system.

See also
allo-Inositol
cis-Inositol
D-chiro-Inositol
L-chiro-Inositol
epi-Inositol
muco-Inositol
scyllo-Inositol

References

Inositol